Adam Kowalski (19 December 1912 – 9 December 1971) was a Polish athlete. As an ice hockey player he played for Cracovia. With Cracovia he won the Polish league championship three times, in 1937, 1946, and 1947. He also played for the Polish national team at the 1932, 1936 and 1948 Winter Olympics and four world championships: 1935, 1937, 1938, and 1939. He died in 1971 in Kraków.

References

External links
 
 
 
 
 

1912 births
1971 deaths
Burials at Rakowicki Cemetery
Ice hockey players at the 1932 Winter Olympics
Ice hockey players at the 1936 Winter Olympics
Ice hockey players at the 1948 Winter Olympics
MKS Cracovia (ice hockey) players
Olympic ice hockey players of Poland
Sportspeople from Ivano-Frankivsk
People from the Kingdom of Galicia and Lodomeria
Polish ice hockey forwards